Catenibacterium mitsuokai  is a Gram-positive and anaerobic bacterium from the genus Catenibacterium which has been isolated from human faeces in Japan.

References

External links
Type strain of Catenibacterium mitsuokai at BacDive -  the Bacterial Diversity Metadatabase	

Erysipelotrichia
Bacteria described in 2000